Garo Mafyan (born 24 February 1951) is a Turkish musician, composer and music producer of Armenian descent.

Personal life
He grew up in Erenköy, Istanbul. He is married to Gülyüz (née Bayraktaroğlu) Mafyan, and has a daughter named Damla. He is related to Agop Dilaçar, one of the head specialists of the Turkish Language Association, as well as Levon Aşçiyan, the last palace doctor.

References

Living people
1951 births
Turkish composers
Turkish people of Armenian descent
Turkish keyboardists
Musicians from Istanbul

Eurovision Song Contest conductors